Kinderton is an electoral ward in Middlewich, Cheshire, England.  Kinderton was also historically the name of a township in Middlewich on the opposite side of the River Croco from the current ward.

In the Imperial Gazetteer of England and Wales (1870–72) John Marius Wilson described Kinderton:

References

Middlewich